Stéphane Vial (born 9 February 1973) is a retired French shot putter.

He won the gold medal at the 1997 Jeux de la Francophonie, and 
competed at the 1998 European Championships and the 2000 European Indoor Championships without reaching the final. He became French champion in 1998 and 1999, and French indoor champion in 2000.

His personal best throw was 18.99 metres, achieved in July 2000 in Saint-Etienne.

References

1967 births
Living people
French male shot putters
Athletes (track and field) at the 1997 Mediterranean Games
Mediterranean Games competitors for France
20th-century French people